The Oriental Textile Mill, located at 2201 Lawrence Street in the Houston Heights neighborhood of Houston, Texas, was listed on the National Register of Historic Places on June 22, 1983.

The mill is a complex of brick industrial buildings, with a four-story clock tower as its most distinguishing feature. Originally built in 1893 for a mattress manufacturing company, the site has seen several uses, including a textile mill, fiberglass manufacturing, a bakery, and mixed use small businesses and live/work spaces.  It was one of the first industrial complexes in Houston Heights, and is the last remaining.

See also
 National Register of Historic Places listings in Harris County, Texas

References

1893 establishments in Texas
Buildings and structures completed in 1893
Industrial buildings and structures on the National Register of Historic Places in Texas
National Register of Historic Places in Houston
Textile mills in the United States